The men's 110 metres hurdles at the 2017 World Championships in Athletics was held at the London Olympic Stadium on .

Summary
Russian defending champion Sergey Shubenkov, having missed the Olympics due to the drugs scandal, was competing as an Authorised Neutral Athlete. Since the last World Championships, Omar McLeod (Jamaica) had won the Indoor World title and the Olympics and had the year's fastest time. The returning silver medallist was his countryman Hansle Parchment, while the returning bronze medalist was world record holder Aries Merritt (United States), who underwent a kidney transplant four days after the previous championships.

In the final, from the gun, McLeod had a slight lead over the first hurdle and retained the lead throughout. Shubenkov looked to be the only athlete gaining on him from behind.	
Balázs Baji (Hungary) was close over the first hurdle, but after hitting the second hurdle fell back to sixth before recovering to take the bronze.

Records
Before the competition records were as follows:

No records were set at the competition.

Qualification standard
The standard to qualify automatically for entry was 13.48.

Schedule
The event schedule, in local time (UTC+1), was as follows:

Results

Heats
The first round took place on 6 August in five heats as follows:

The first four in each heat ( Q ) and the next four fastest ( q ) qualified for the semifinals. The overall results were as follows:

Semifinals
The semifinals took place on 6 August in three heats as follows:

The first two in each heat ( Q ) and the next two fastest ( q ) qualified for the final. The overall results were as follows:

Final
The final took place on 7 August at 21:31. The wind was 0.0 metres per second and the results were as follows (photo finish):

References

110
Sprint hurdles at the World Athletics Championships